Two Thousand Years may refer to:

 Two Thousand Years (play), a 2005 play by Mike Leigh
 A song on the Endless Wire album by The Who
 A song on the River of Dreams album by Billy Joel